Koelpinia is a genus of flowering plants in the family Asteraceae. 

The genus Koelpinia, authored by Peter Simon Pallas, was named after Pallas friend Alexander Bernhard Koelpin (1739–1801), who was a German physician and botanist, and director of the Greifswald Botanic Garden and Arboretum from 1765 to 1767, after which he became professor at Marienstiftsgymnasium in Stettin.

 Species
 Koelpinia chrysoglochis Rech.f. - Iran, Iraq
 Koelpinia deflexa Stschegl. - Central Asia
 Koelpinia linearis Pall. - from Morocco to Xinjiang
 Koelpinia macrantha C.Winkl. - Iran, Afghanistan, Central Asia
 Koelpinia sessilis Boiss. - Iran
 Koelpinia tenuissima Pavlov & Lipsch. - Iran, Afghanistan, Pakistan, Central Asia
 Koelpinia turanica Vassilcz. - Central Asia

References

Asteraceae genera
Cichorieae